The 1989 Northeast Conference men's basketball tournament was held February 28-March 3, 1989. The tournament featured the top six teams from the 9-team conference. Robert Morris won their third ECAC Metro/NEC championship, and received the conference's automatic bid to the 1989 NCAA tournament.

Format
The NEC Men’s Basketball Tournament consisted of a six-team playoff format with all games played at the venue of the higher seed. The top two seeds received a bye in the first round.

Bracket

References

Northeast Conference men's basketball tournament
Tournament
Northeast Conference men's basketball tournament
Northeast Conference men's basketball tournament
Northeast Conference men's basketball tournament